Raphaël Cendo (born 26 February 1975) is a French composer of contemporary classical music.

Life 
Born in Nice, after studying piano and composition at the École Normale de Musique de Paris, Cendo followed the composition curriculum of the Conservatoire de Paris (2000–2003), from which he graduated in composition, analysis and orchestration. He then entered the composition and computer music class of the IRCAM. (2003–2006). During his training, he will have received the lessons of Allain Gaussin, Marco Stroppa, Brian Ferneyhough, Fausto Romitelli and Philippe Manoury.

He has taught at the Conservatoire de Nanterre, the Escola Superior de Música de Catalunya of Barcelona (Catalonia College of Music), at the Darmstadt Summer School (2012–2014), at the "New Voices" composition sessions in Royaumont Abbey (2012–2016) and is regularly invited to give master classes and conferences in the United States, Russia and Europe. He is the director of the University of Altitude, a summer academy of composition that takes place every year in Saint-Martin-Vésubie.

From 2009 to 2011, he was a resident at the Villa Medici of the French Academy in Rome. In 2007, Cendo received the Prix Espoir, awarded by the Francis and Mica Salabert Foundation, from the Montreal Symphony Orchestra's International Composition Competition. In 2009, he received the Pierre Cardin Prize from the Académie des Beaux-Arts and in 2011 and 2015 the Hervé Dugardin and Georges Enesco Prize from SACEM. Cendo currently lives and works in Berlin.

Work 
Influenced by spectral music, current and popular music, composers such as Brian Ferneyhough and Fausto Romitelli, Cendo (like ) promotes the concept of 'saturation' or 'saturated music'. Concept of excess, the important thing is to go beyond pure sound, absolute control of the note, interpretation by new complex sounds: "The saturated phenomenon in the field of acoustics is an excess of matter, energy, movement and timbre." His music thus pushes to the limits the notions of timbre, frequency space, intensity and instrumental gestures.

His works are performed by internationally renowned musicians and ensembles such as the Klangforum Wien, the Tana Quartet, Linea, Dal Niente, Alternance, Cairn, Ictus, Intercontemporain, Itinéraire, musikFabrik, the Nouvel Ensemble Moderne, Either/Or, Yarn/Wire, the Diotima Quartet, the Orchestre national d'Île-de-France, the Montreal Symphony Orchestra, the Bavarian Radio Symphony Orchestra, the Munich Radio Orchestra, Les Percussions de Strasbourg, etc.

He has participated in many events including Ars Musica in Brussels, Venice Biennale, Darmstädter Ferienkurse, Donaueschingen Festival,  in Milan, Musica in Strasbourg,  of Radio France, the Tremplin Concerts of the Centre Pompidou, Voix Nouvelles in Royaumont, Why Note in Dijon, Archipel, composer portraits series at the Miller Theatre, New York City.

Awards 
 2007: Prix Espoir, awarded by the Fondation Francis and Mica Salabert
 2009: Prix Pierre Cardin of the Académie des Beaux-Arts
 2011: Prix Hervé Dugardin of the SACEM

Works 
His works – unless otherwise stated – are published by Maison ONA.

 Scratch data (2002) for percussion and electronics
 Rage in the heaven city (2004) for large orchestra
 Masse-Métal (2005) for twenty-five musicians
 Action painting (2005) for fifteen musicians, Verlag Neue Musik
 Décombres (2006) for contrabass clarinet and electronics
 Action Directe (2007) for bass clarinet and thirteen musicians ensemble
 Tract (2007) for seven musicians
 Octa 7 (2007) for harp and electronics, on a choreography by 
 Refontes (2008) for six percussion and electronics, 
 Charge (2009) for seven instruments and electronics on a video by Paolo Pacchini, Gérard Billaudot Éditeur
 Introduction aux ténèbres (2009), for double bass, bass voice and electronics, Gérard Billaudot Éditeur
 Furia (2009/2010) for cello and piano, Verlag Neue Musik
 Faction pour piano (2011), percussion and electric guitar
 Shadow (2011) for six singers
 In Vivo (2011) for string Quartet (No 1), Gérard Billaudot Éditeur
 Rokh (2011–2012) for flute, violin, cello and piano, Verlag Neue Musik
 Foris (2012) for cello and electronics, Verlag Neue Musik
 Carbone (2012) for double bass flute, trumpet, guitar and ensemble
 Substance (2013) for string quartet (No 2), Verlag Neue Musik
 Registre des Lumières (2013) for vocal ensemble, instrumental and electronic ensemble live, Verlag Neue Musik
 Graphein (2014) for nine musicians, Verlag Neue Musik
 Badlands (2014) for percussion
 Corps (2015) Concerto for piano , Verlag Neue Musik
 Radium (2016) for seven musicians
 Denkklange (2016) for symphony orchestra
 Delocazione (2017) Quartet (No 3) for string quartet and vocal quartet
 Oracles (2018) Opera
 Le jour juste avant l'océan (2018) for vocal, instrumental and jazz ensemble
 Individua (2018) for organ and augmented choir
 Ars satura (2019) for flute, saxophone, percussion and piano

Discography 
 Raphaël Cendo, Introduction Aux Ténèbres, ensemble Ictus, in "Donaueschinger Musiktage 2009", 1 CD Neos, 2010.
 Raphaël Cendo, Furia, includes: Charge ; Furia ; Décombres; In Vivo and Tract, Ensemble Cairn, direction: Guillaume Bourgogne, 1 CD Aeon Records, 2012.
 Raphaël Cendo, Rokh, ensemble Alternance, 1 CD Stradivarius, 2012.

Bibliography

References

External links 
 
 ,  Registre des lumières, premiere at 2016 Donaueschingen Festival, SWR Vokalensemble, Ensemble Musikfabrik, Marcus Creed (conductor)
 , No. 3, track 5 of "Les mardis de la saturation", 9 March 210 – 6 April 2010.

1975 births
Living people
People from Nice
École Normale de Musique de Paris alumni
Conservatoire de Paris alumni
21st-century French composers
French male composers
French music educators
21st-century French male musicians